Mauboussin is a French jewellery firm started in 1827.

The company's estimated sales (in 2010/2011) were €60 million in total sales and €10 million in watches.

References

External links
http://www.mauboussin.com/

Jewellery retailers of France